Cathy DeBuono is an American actress and practicing psychotherapist.

Biography
DeBuono was born on March 20, 1970, in Yonkers, New York, and raised in Bronxville.

In her teens and early 20s, DeBuono was an athlete, playing volleyball while attending University of Kentucky from 1988 to 1991. As a volleyball player, DeBuono received several awards and medals, including consecutive gold medals at the U.S. Olympic Festival in 1990 and 1991.

When a knee injury ended her high level athletic career, DeBuono focused on her acting career. While at University of Kentucky, DeBuono performed in a stage play directed by alumni student Ashley Judd. She went on to study at the American Academy of Dramatic Arts, graduating in 1994.

Starting in 1997, DeBuono appeared in the last three seasons of Star Trek: Deep Space Nine as M'Pella, a dabo girl in Quark's bar. DeBuono also worked on the series as a stand-in, photo double, and body double for Terry Farrell. DeBuono received no on-screen credits until her final appearance in the episode The Dogs of War. DeBuono also appeared as a background regular in several episodes of the television series Chicago Hope as a paramedic. DeBuono was involved in the comedy series Jenny, The Pretender, Pacific Blue, Martial Law, Becker and Exes and Oh's.

DeBuono is an out lesbian, and has appeared in the short film Gay Propaganda (2002), the award-winning Out at the Wedding (2007), the romantic comedy And Then Came Lola (2008), and the short drama Tremble & Spark (2008). For the 2007 short film, The Touch, she worked as associate producer and still photographer.

While working as an actress, DeBuono returned to studies at Antioch University Los Angeles. In 2003, she graduated with a Master's in Clinical Psychology, and is a member of the California Association of Marriage and Family Therapists, licensed in marriage and family therapy. Since 2011 she has hosted her own weekly radio program, Cathy Is In: The Cathy DeBuono Show, giving advice to call-in listeners on LA Talk Radio, Transformation Talk Radio and CBS New Sky Radio affiliates.

As of 2012, DeBuono was engaged to actress Jill Bennett, who she started dating when they co-starred in And Then Came Lola, with the two later working together on the Cathy Is In: The Cathy DeBuono Show. By 2013, the couple had split.

Filmography
 Crazy Bitches (2014) as Cassie
 Meth Head (2013) as Theresa Stevens
 Itsy Bitsy Spiders (2012) as Lucy (short film)
 A Perfect Ending (2012) as Dawn
 Bounty (2011 film) | Bounty (2011) as Dani Sanders (short film)
 We Have to Stop Now (2009 - 2010) as Dyna (15 episodes)
 Rose by Any Other Name... (2009) as Renee
 And Then Came Lola (2009) as Danielle
 Tremble and Spark (2009) as Charlie Frost (short film)
 3Way (2008 - 2009) as Dr. Anglea Carlisi (2 episodes)
 Out at the Wedding (2007) as Risa
 Exes and Ohs (2007) as Becca (1 episode)
 Becker (2003) as Ms. Reynolds (1 episode)
 Gay Propaganda (2002) as Henria (short film)
 Command & Conquer: Tiberian Sun (1999) as Soldier (video game)
 Star Trek: Deep Space Nine (1997-1999) as M'Pella (16 episodes)
 Martial Law (1999) as Joy Waters (1 episode)
 Chicago Hope (1996 - 1998) as Paramedic (3 episodes)
 Pacific Blue (1998) as Matron Sara Dexter (1 episode)
 The Pretender (1998) as Staff Sgt. Alyssa Padilla (1 episode)
 Jenny (1998) as Women #1 (1 episode)
 Phoenix (1998) as Stripper

References

External links
 CathyDeBuono.com - official site
 Facebook
 
 Cathy DeBuono article at OutSports.com

1970 births
Living people
Actresses from New York (state)
Kentucky Wildcats women's volleyball players
American lesbian actresses
American television actresses
People from Yonkers, New York
People from Bronxville, New York
Lesbian sportswomen
American LGBT sportspeople
LGBT volleyball players
21st-century American LGBT people